The 1959 International Cross Country Championships was held in Lisbon, Portugal, at the National Stadium on March 21, 1959. Morocco entered a team for the first time after gaining independence.    A report on the event was given in the Glasgow Herald.

Complete results, medallists, 
 and the results of British athletes were published.

Medallists

Individual Race Results

Men's (9 mi / 14.5 km)

Team Results

Men's

Participation
An unofficial count yields the participation of 78 athletes from 9 countries.

 (9)
 (9)
 (9)
 (9)
 (9)
 (9)
 (7)
 (9)
 (8)

See also
 1959 in athletics (track and field)

References

International Cross Country Championships
International Cross Country Championships
Cross
International Cross Country Championships
Sports competitions in Lisbon
International Cross Country Championships, 1959
Cross country running in Portugal
International Cross Country Championships